"Dangerous Power" is a track by Gabriel & Dresden and Jan Burton. Under the label Organized Nature, the track  won the "Best Alternative/Rock Dance Track" in the IDMA in 2007. The song was written by Dave Dresden, Josh Gabriel, Jes Brieden and Jan Burton. It is widely rumored that the song is written in reference to the relationship between Dave Dresden and his then girlfriend and world-renowned DJ Sandra Collins.

Track listing

Catalog#: ORGN008A
Side A of an Organized Nature 12 inch vinyl.
Dangerous Power (Gabriel & Dresden Extended Mix) - 9:16
Dangerous Power (Cicada Remix) - 7:42
Dangerous Power (Discount Rhinos Acappella) - 7:42

Catalog#: ORGN008B
Side B of an Organized Nature 12 inch vinyl.
Dangerous Power (Discount Rhinos Dubber Rucky Mix) - 7:58
Dangerous Power (Kuffdam & Plant Mix) - 9:39

Catalog#: ORGN008
Dangerous Power (Gabriel & Dresden Extended Mix)
Dangerous Power (Cicada Full Vocal Mix)
Dangerous Power (Cicada Dub)
Dangerous Power (Cicada Radio Edit)
Dangerous Power (Discount Rhinos Rucky Dubber Mix)
Dangerous Power (Discount Rhinos Full Vocal)
Dangerous Power (Discount Rhinos Accapella)
Dangerous Power (Kuffdam & Plant Remix)

Chart positions

References 

2007 singles
Songs written by Josh Gabriel
2006 songs